Roger Federer has won 20 Grand Slam singles titles, third to Rafael Nadal (22) and Novak Djokovic (22). He has reached 31 Grand Slam finals, second behind Djokovic (33), including 10 consecutive, and another 8 consecutive (the two longest finals streaks in history), 46 semifinal appearances, and 58 quarterfinal appearances. He is one of eight men to have won a career Grand Slam (winning all four Grand Slams at least once) which he achieved in 2009 and is one of four players to have won a career Grand Slam on three different surfaces, hard, grass and clay courts. Federer has won 8 Wimbledon titles, an all-time record. From 2005 to 2010 Federer reached the finals in 18 out of 19 consecutive grand slams, winning 12 titles. He is one of two male players (along with Djokovic) to win two different Grand Slam tournaments at least 6 times (Australian Open, Wimbledon) and the only player to win 3 different tournaments at least 5 times (Wimbledon, Australian Open, US Open). He is the only player to win two Grand Slams five consecutive times at Wimbledon from 2003 to 2007 and the US Open from 2004 to 2008. Federer has spent 310 weeks as the No. 1 ranked player in the world, second only to Djokovic, and a record of 237 consecutive weeks.

Federer has won 11 hard court Grand Slam titles (6 at the Australian Open and 5 at the US Open), which is second behind Djokovic (13). He is the only player to win 5 consecutive titles at the US Open (2004–08). Federer has won an all-time record of 71 hard court titles. Federer has won an all-time record 7 Cincinnati Masters 1000 titles including an all time record of 8 Cincinnati Finals appearances. He has also won an all-time record 10 Swiss Indoors titles and has reached the final at the Swiss Indoors for a total of 15 years (2000–01, 2006–15, 2017–19) and 10 consecutive years (2006–15) and is the only player to ever achieve both feats in the Open Era in any tournament. Federer has also registered a 56-match win streak on hard courts which is the all-time record.

Federer's most successful surface is grass where he has won an Open Era record 19 grass court titles including an all-time record 10 Halle Open titles and an all-time record of 8 Wimbledon titles. He reached an all-time record 7 consecutive Wimbledon finals from 2003 to 2009. Federer has the longest grass court winning streak in the Open Era as he won 65 consecutive matches on grass from 2003 to 2008 where he was beaten by Nadal in the 2008 Wimbledon final. Due to his success on grass courts, Federer is considered by many as the greatest grass court player of all time.

Federer has also been successful on clay courts. He has reached 5 French Open finals (losing in 4 finals to Nadal, who is widely considered to be the greatest clay court player ever), and has won 6 Masters 1000 titles on clay from 16 finals. Federer won his first and only French Open title in 2009 when he also won Wimbledon, thus achieving the "Channel Slam" alongside Rod Laver, Björn Borg, Nadal and later Djokovic. Federer has won 11 clay court titles from 26 finals (11 of his clay court finals losses have been to Nadal, against 2 finals wins). His consistency in his prime years on clay was surpassed only by Nadal, and Federer was widely viewed as the second greatest clay court player from 2005 to 2011 when he achieved 1 quarterfinal, 1 semi-final, 4 runners-up, and 1 title (he succumbed only to Nadal in the semi-final and finals he lost).

Federer is the only player to register at least ten titles on clay, grass and hard courts; he has 71 hard court titles, 19 grass court titles, and 11 clay court titles.  In his prime years, he won an unparalleled 11 Grand Slam tournaments (3 Australian Open titles, 4 Wimbledon titles and 4 US Open titles) of 16 events from 2004 to 2007. He reached the finals of all four Grand Slam tournaments in the same calendar year in 2006, 2007, and 2009 which is an all time record, joining Rod Laver (1969) and later joined by Djokovic (2015, 2021). In the World Tour Finals, the prestigious year-end tournament featuring the top-8 players in the year-end rankings, Federer has won 6 titles from 10 finals, both Open Era records (the record of 6 titles was later tied by Djokovic), and reached 16 semi-finals at 17 appearances.  He has qualified for the tournament a record 14 consecutive years from 2002 through 2015. Following an injury enforced absence for 6 months in 2016, he qualified second to Rafael Nadal for the ATP Finals for a record 15th time in 2017. That year was the first time Federer won multiple Grand Slam titles since 2009.

Federer was selected by fellow players as winner of the Stefan Edberg Sportsmanship Award 13 times (2004–2009, 2011–2017). Fans voted for him in 2020 to receive the ATPWorldTour.com Fans' Favourite Award for an 18th straight year (since 2003). Since his Grand Slam winning debut in 2003, Federer has won a record total of 39 ATP World Tour Awards.

As of November 2020 Federer holds the world's second highest number of performance-based Guinness World Records ever achieved within a single athletic discipline (37 total / 26 performance based).

All-time records 
 These records were attained since the amateur era and the Open Era of tennis, beginning since 1877.

 Federer has won 20 Grand Slam men's singles titles, the third most in history behind Nadal and Djokovic. Federer broke the previous all-time record held by Pete Sampras (14) in 2009 before Nadal and Djokovic surpassed him in 2022.
 Federer has been ranked world No. 1 for 310 total weeks in the Open Era. In 2012, Federer broke the previous ATP record of 286 weeks as No. 1, held by Sampras. Federer has held the record of weeks as No. 1 until 8 March 2021, when Djokovic broke his record. Additionally, from 2004 through 2008, Federer held the top singles ranking for 237 consecutive weeks, breaking Jimmy Connors' 31-year-old record of 160 consecutive weeks.

Open Era records - Grand Slams 

 These records were attained in the Open Era of tennis.

Open Era records at each Grand Slam tournament 

 Federer is the first and only player to win both Wimbledon and the US Open for four consecutive years, a feat he achieved from 2004 until 2007.

ATP Finals and ATP Masters records 
 1970, 1971 - Round robin with no semifinals or finals, winner decided on best performed player
 1982, 1983, 1984 - 12 player knock-out tournament with no round robin. The top four seeds in the event received a bye in the first round.
 1985 - 16 player knock-out tournament with no round robin
 In the current tournament, winners are awarded up to 1500 rankings points; with each round-robin loss, 200 points are deducted from that amount.
 Grand Prix Championship Series began in 1970.
 ATP Masters Series was introduced in 1990.
 Renamed ATP Masters 1000 in 2009.

 Roger Federer is the first player to win more than 5 titles at the World Tour Finals. Federer is the first and only player to reach 10 finals overall and 16 semifinals. He has appeared in the 8-man year-end tournament 14 consecutive times and total 17 times, and is the only player to achieve both these feats in the open era.
 Roger Federer is the first player to win nine different Masters events of the ATP Masters.
 Roger Federer is the first player to win five different Masters tournaments with no sets dropped.
 Roger Federer is the first player to win Masters tournaments with no sets dropped on three surfaces (Hard/Clay/Indoors).
 Roger Federer is the only player to win a single Masters tournament on three different court surfaces ( Madrid - Hard Indoors, Red Clay, Blue Clay Outdoors)

Records at each ATP 500 Series tournament 

 3 out of the 10 Swiss Indoors titles were won when the tournament was an ATP 250 series event before 2009.
 Halle Open used to be an ATP 250 series tournament before 2015 when Federer won the majority (7) of his titles there.

Other significant records (ATP rankings achievements*, ATP 500 & 250 Series & win streaks) 
 * The ATP ranking was frozen from 23 March to 23 August 2020

Guinness World Records 
As of November 2020 Roger Federer holds the world's second highest number of Guinness World records within one discipline - 22 performance based records. Higher number (33) is held by Fiann Paul.

performance based records:

 Most consecutive Men's Grand Slam semi-finals
 First male player to win 100 singles matches at a Grand Slam tennis tournament
 Most Wimbledon Men's singles tennis titles
 Most French Open Tennis Men's Singles Final defeats
 Most tennis singles matches on grass won consecutively (male)
 Most tennis Grand Slam singles matches won
 Most tennis Grand Slam singles matches won (male)
 Most wins of the singles ATP World Tour Finals
 Most aces served in a Grand Slam singles final
 First tennis player to reach 10 consecutive finals at a single tournament
 Most grass-court singles titles won consecutively
 First tennis player to win 10 finals on two different surfaces
 Most consecutive tennis final victories
 Most consecutive tennis Grand Slam quarter-finals
 Most consecutive Grand Slam singles finals (male)
 First tennis player to defend 10 Grand Slam singles titles (male)
 Most consecutive seasons at the ATP World Tour Finals
 Most finals played at a single tennis tournament
 Most singles appearances at the ATP Finals
 Most matches played on the ATP Tour without retiring
 Most games in a tennis Wimbledon singles final (male)

other records:

 Oldest tennis player ranked world number one (male)
 Most powerful sports star
 Most Laureus World Sports Awards won
 Most Laureus World Sportsman of the Year awards won
 Longest Wimbledon singles final
 Most playable real-life characters in a tennis video game
 Most tennis Grand Slam meetings (singles)
 Longest Olympic tennis match (duration)

Awards

This is a list of awards Swiss tennis player Roger Federer has won in his career.

1998

 ITF World Junior Champion

2003
 ATP European Player of the Year
 Swiss Sportsman of the Year
 Swiss of the Year
 Michael-Westphal Award

2004
 ATP European Player of the Year
 ATPTennis.com Fans' Favourite award (For the year 2003)
 ITF World Champion
 Sports Illustrated Tennis Player of the Year
 Swiss Sportsman of the Year
 Reuters International Sportsman of the Year
 BBC Overseas Sports Personality of the Year
 International Tennis Writers Association (ITWA) Player of the Year
International Tennis Writers Ambassador（ITWA） for Tennis
 European Sportsman of the Year (aka UEPS [Federation of European sports journalists] Sportsman of the Year)

2005
 Ambassador of United Nations' Year of Sport and Physical Education
 Goldene Kamera Award
 ATP Player of the Year (for the year 2004)
 Stefan Edberg Sportsmanship Award (for the year 2004)
 ATPTennis.com Fans' Favourite (for the year 2004)
 Laureus World Sportsman of the Year (for the year 2004)
 Michael-Westphal Award
 International Tennis Writers Association (ITWA) Player of the Year
 International Tennis Writers Ambassador for Tennis
 Most Outstanding Athlete by the United States Sports Academy
 Freedom Air People's Choice Sports Awards International Sportsperson of the Year
 ITF World Champion
 ESPY Best Male Tennis Player
 La Gazzetta dello Sport named him World Sportsman of the Year
 European Sportsman of the Year (aka UEPS [Federation of European sports journalists] Sportsman of the Year)
 The 'Prix Orange' Award

2006
 L'Equipe Magazine's Champion of Champions (for the year 2005)
 ATP Player of the Year (for the year 2005)
 Stefan Edberg Sportsmanship Award (for the year 2005)
 ATPTennis.com Fans' Favourite (for the year 2005)
 Laureus World Sportsman of the Year (for the year 2005)
 ESPY Best Male Tennis Player
 International Tennis Writers Association (ITWA) Player of the Year
 International Tennis Writers Ambassador for Tennis
 ITF World Champion
 BBC Overseas Sports Personality of the Year
 Swiss Sportsman of the Year
 EFE's Sportsman of the Year
 Most Outstanding Athlete of the Year by The United States Sports Academy
 European Sportsman of the Year (aka UEPS [Federation of European sports journalists] Sportsman of the Year)
 La Gazzetta dello Sport named him World Sportsman of the Year
 The 'Prix Orange' Award
 Baccarat Athlete of the Year 2006

2007
 Time magazine named him as one of the 100 most important people in the world.
 L'Equipe Magazine's Champion of Champions (for the year 2006)
 ATP Player of the Year (for the year 2006)
 Stefan Edberg Sportsmanship Award (for the year 2006)
 ATPTennis.com Fans' Favourite (for the year 2006)
 Arthur Ashe Humanitarian of the Year (for the year 2006)
 Laureus World Sportsman of the Year (for the year 2006)
 ESPY Best Male Tennis Player
 ESPY Best Male International Athlete
 ITF World Champion
 BBC Overseas Sports Personality of the Year
 Tennis magazine's 2007 player of the year
 La Gazzetta dello Sport named him World Sportsman of the Year
 Swiss Sportsman of the Year
 The 'Prix Orange' Award
 Marca Leyenda

2008
 L'Equipe Magazine's Champion of Champions (for the year 2007)
 European Sportsman of the Year (for the year 2007) (aka UEPS [Federation of European sports journalists] Sportsman of the Year)
 Laureus World Sportsman of the Year (for the year 2007) – First ever winner of four Laureus World Sports Awards
 Men's Doubles gold medalist partnering Stanislas Wawrinka at the 2008 Olympic Games held in Beijing, China
 ATP Player of the Year (for the year 2007)
 Stefan Edberg Sportsmanship Award (for the year 2007)
 ATPTennis.com Fans' Favourite (for the year 2007)
 ESPY Best Male Tennis Player
 Swiss Team of the Year (with Stanislas Wawrinka)
 The 'Prix Orange' Award

2009
 Stefan Edberg Sportsmanship Award (for the year 2008)
 ATPWorldtour.com (formerly ATPTennis.com) Fans' Favourite (for the year 2008)
 Talksport Hall of Fame
 ESPY Best Male Tennis Player
 Ehrespalebaerglemer award. An award given to outstanding citizens of the city of Basel.
 ATPWorldtour.com Player of the Decade
 ITF World Champion
 European Sportsman of the Year (aka UEPS [Federation of European sports journalists] Sportsman of the Year)
 One of Sports Illustrated's Athletes of the Decade
 Listed at #27 on the Forbes Celebrity 100
 European Sportsman of the Year
 The 'Prix Orange' Award
 Best Match of the Year

2010
 International Tennis Writers' Association's Ambassador of the Year
 ESPY Best Male Tennis Player
 ATP Player of the Year (for the year 2009)
 ATPWorldTour.com Fans' Favourite (for the year 2009)
 Stefan Edberg Sportsmanship Award (for the year 2009)
 ATPWorldTour.com Fans' Favourite (for the year 2010)
 MARCA magazine's Sportsman of the Decade
 Listed at #29 on the Forbes Celebrity 100
 Compeed Elegance Award

2011
 Stefan Edberg Sportsmanship Award
 ATPWorldtour.com Fans' Favourite
 Listed at #25 on the Forbes Celebrity 100
 Best Grand Slam/Davis Cup Match of the Year
 Only player to "bagel" (6-0 set) Nadal on three different surfaces. (2006 Wimbledon (Grass), 2007 Hamburg (Clay) 2011 World Tour Finals (indoor hard)

2012
 Listed at #1 in 100 Greatest of All Time by Tennis Channel
 Listed at #5 in Forbes list of 100 richest athletes of the world
 Singles silver medalist at 2012 Olympic Games held in London, England
 Stefan Edberg Sportsmanship Award
 ATPWorldtour.com Fans' Favourite
 Swiss Sportsman of the Year
 Hello Magazine's Most Attractive Man of 2012
 Davis Cup Commitment Award

2013
 Stefan Edberg Sportsmanship Award
 ATPWorldtour.com Fans' Favourite
 Arthur Ashe Humanitarian of the Year
 Jean Borotra Sportsmanship Award.

2014
 US Open Sportsmanship Award
 Stefan Edberg Sportsmanship Award
 ATPWorldtour.com Fans' Favourite
 Swiss Sportsman of the Year
 Swiss Team of the Year (with Stanislas Wawrinka, Marco Chiudinelli, Michael Lammer, Severin Lüthi )
 Best Grand Slam Match of the Year
 Davis Cup Most Valuable Player (shared with Stan Wawrinka)

2015
International Tennis Writers' Association's Ambassador of the Year (for the year 2014)
 Stefan Edberg Sportsmanship Award
 ATPWorldtour.com Fans' Favourite
International Tennis Writers' Association's Ambassador of the Year

2016
 Stefan Edberg Sportsmanship Award
 ATPWorldtour.com Fans' Favourite
 Most Stylish Man of the Year by GQ
 Most Marketable Sports Person
 Top global athlete brand in Forbes Fab 40

2017
 Stefan Edberg Sportsmanship Award
 ATPWorldtour.com Fans' Favourite
 Comeback Player of the year
 Best ATP World Tour match of the year
 Best Grand Slam match of the year
 Swiss Sportsman of the Year
 BBC Overseas Sports Personality of the Year
 ESPY Best Male Tennis Player
AIPS Athletes of the Year
L'Equipe Magazine's Champion of Champions
 La Gazzetta dello Sport named him World Sportsman of the Year
Eurosport International Athlete of the Year
 ESPN's MVP
 Sports Illustrated's Tennis MVP

2018
International Tennis Writers' Association's Ambassador of the Year (for the year 2017)
 European Sportsman of the Year  (for the year 2017) (aka UEPS [Federation of European sports journalists] Sportsman of the Year)
 Laureus World Sportsman of the Year (for the year 2017)
 Laureus World Comeback of the Year (for the year 2017)
ESPY Best Male Tennis Player
 ATPWorldtour.com Fans' Favourite
Best Record-Breaking Performance ESPY Award
Best ATP World Tour match of the year

2019
 ESPY Best Male Tennis Player
Best Grand slam match of the year
 ATPTour.com Fans' Favourite
 Most Stylish Man of the Decade by GQ

2020
Swiss Sportsman of the last 70 years
ITF Champion of Champions
ATPTour.com Fans' Favourite Award

2021
ATPTour.com Fans' Favourite Award

2022
Honorary Swiss Sports award

See also
 List of career achievements by Rafael Nadal
 List of career achievements by Novak Djokovic
List of career achievements by Andy Murray

Notes

Footnotes

Federer, Roger
Achievements